National Lampoon's Pledge This! is a 2006 American comedy film starring Paris Hilton, who also served as an executive producer. The film was released straight to video.

Plot
When a dorm toilet explodes on the first day back to school, a group of misfit girls are forced to leave their housing and search for a new home. They ultimately decide on pledging a sorority. However, not many sororities are normal at South Beach University. The girls decide to pledge the most popular and exclusive sorority at the university, Gamma Gamma, which is led by president Victoria English.

While pledging the sorority, Victoria sends the girls to do a task: collect used condoms. While searching the park, the leader of the group, Gloria, bumps into Victoria's boyfriend Derek, and they become close. The only reason Victoria plans to let the freshmen pledge is to display diversity, which is a requirement for the "FHM Hottest Sorority in the Country" contest. From then on, Victoria declares war on the girls during "Hell Week" but ultimately lets them join, only to kick them out once they have won the contest. This angers the leader of the misfit freshmen, Gloria. Gloria decides to quit the sorority as do her friends. Derek and Gloria realize their feelings towards each other and seal it with a kiss.

Gloria's ex-best friend, Kristen, convinces Gloria to come back. Gloria and her friends come back but only to declare war on Victoria by sneaking into the Gamma Gamma house and stealing embarrassing photos and video footage of her to show to everyone at the Gamma Gamma victory party. The video also showed her badmouthing her sorority sisters, and her past dorky self. She also reveals to Victoria that she and Derek love each other. Victoria becomes embarrassed and eventually realizes how reinventing herself made her into a bad person, so she makes a public apology to the freshmen. The movie ends with a giant food fight at the Gamma Gamma party, and Victoria saying that she loved her cover of FHM so much she bought the magazine. Gloria becomes the president of Gamma Gamma the following year.

Cast

 Paris Hilton as Victoria English
 Paula Garcés as Gloria 
 Sarah Carter as Kristen
 Simon Rex as Derek
 Holly Valance as Jessica
 Elizabeth Daily as Catherine Johnson
 Kerri Kenney Silver as Kathy
 Alexis Thorpe as Morgan
 Geoffrey Arend as Dax
 Noureen DeWulf as PooPoo Patel
 Kyle Richards as Lisa
 Greg Cipes as Reed
 Sarai Howard as Tonya
 Amanda Lee Aday as Maxine Picker
 Dieter Meier as Gamsie
 Eugenio Derbez-Gonzalez as Jose
 Preston Lacy as Randy
 Sofía Vergara as herself/Presenter FHM Hostess
 Carmen Electra as herself/FHM Invited Hostess
 Paulina Rubio as herself
 Nicky Hilton (uncredited) as Nicky
 Amanda Rowan as Trista
 Lin Shaye as Miss Prin
 Mickey as Heather

Production
Principal photography began in early 2004 in Miami, Florida before Hilton started filming her theatrical debut House of Wax. Filming finished later that same year and a trailer was released on the film's official website. However, producers wanted Pledge This! to have an R-rating, which would allow more nudity in the film. Hilton disagreed with the proposal. More scenes with nudity were shot, thus pushing the film back to mid-2005.

Post production was finalized at World Entertainment - LA in Los Angeles by Edward Oleschak.

Due to the hurricanes that hit Florida in 2005, filming was delayed and then ultimately moved. This pushed the movie back to early 2006. Fans were confused that the trailer had proclaimed this film as "Paris Hilton's film debut" yet she had already appeared in 2005's House of Wax. Finally in spring of 2006, it was announced that National Lampoon's Pledge This! would be released as an unrated DVD on December 19, 2006. It was also released on a rated R edition. Hilton missed the premiere of the movie in protest to the addition of the aforementioned nude scenes. Hilton said, "I was so angry I snubbed my own premiere." In August 2008, Worldwide Entertainment Group Inc. sued Hilton in the Miami District Court, alleging she did not honor her contractual agreement to provide "reasonable promotion and publicity" for the film.

Critical reception
Pledge This! has a 0% approval rating on Rotten Tomatoes based on 6 reviews, with an average score of 2.06 out of 10.

References

External links
 
 
 
 

Pledge This!
2006 films
2006 direct-to-video films
2006 comedy films
American comedy films
2000s English-language films
Films about fraternities and sororities
Films set in Miami
Films shot in Miami
American independent films
2006 directorial debut films
2006 independent films
2000s American films